The Pacific Northwest Geographical Union is the Geographical Union (GU) for rugby union teams playing in the Idaho, Oregon and Washington (state) for USA Rugby.

See also
Rugby union in the United States

References

External links
USA Rugby Official Site
IRB Official Site

Rugby union governing bodies in the United States